Dolichoderus angusticornis is a species of ant in the genus Dolichoderus. Described by John S. Clark in 1930, the species is endemic to Australia, found in dry scrub heath in Western Australia and South Australia. Workers are diurnal and foraging during the day and at night.

References

Dolichoderus
Hymenoptera of Australia
Insects described in 1930